Zathura is a 2002  science fiction children's picture book written and illustrated by American author Chris Van Allsburg. In the story, two boys are drawn into an intergalactic space adventure when their house is magically hurled through space. The book is a sequel to the 1981 children's book Jumanji, also by Van Allsburg, and visual and textual references are made to "Jumanji" in the story. The book was adapted into a film, titled Zathura: A Space Adventure, in 2005.

Plot
Zathura picks up where Jumanji left off, as the parents of two brothers, Danny and Walter Budwing, are leaving. The two brothers don't get along with each other. Danny wants to play catch, while Walter wants to watch television. Danny tosses Walter a baseball which hits him on the head. Walter then chases Danny through the house and catches him in the park across the street from their house, where they find the insidious Jumanji board game. Danny brings the game home, where he then loses interest in playing it.

Underneath Jumanji, Danny finds another game called Zathura. Danny starts playing this game, then he gets a card that says, "Meteor shower, take evasive action", to which an actual meteor shower occurs. Danny and Walter soon realize that the game is affecting reality and has sent them into outer space. Danny concludes that they must finish it in order to return home, so they continue playing. Soon, Walter loses his gravity and Danny saves him from disappearing into space.

When Walter takes his turn, a defective robot chases him through the house. When Danny takes his, he gets close to a star called Tsouris 3 and gets shorter and wider. Soon, a ship carrying extraterrestrials known as Zorgons arrive and they board the house. The robot chases the creatures away as Walter takes his turn and gets pulled into a black hole and sent back in time. Walter is transported back to when he was with Danny in the park. When Danny finds Jumanji and is about to take it home, Walter throws it out and instead offers to play catch with Danny. Evidently, having gone through these dangerous adventures and helping each other has brought the two brothers closer together.

Reception
Publishers Weekly said the book was a "satisfying enigma" like its predecessor. Booklist said readers of Jumanji would also like Zathura. Alternatively, The Horn Book Magazine said the book did not work as a sequel to Jumanji but worked as part of a series.

Film adaptation
A film adaptation of the book titled Zathura: A Space Adventure was made in 2005, directed by Jon Favreau. It received positive reviews from critics but was not a commercial success.

See also

 Jumanji (picture book)

References

External links
 Zathura on the author's site
 

 2002 American novels
 2002 children's books
 American fantasy novels
 American science fiction novels
 Children's books adapted into films
 Children's science fiction novels
 Fictional games
 Novels by Chris Van Allsburg
 Picture books by Chris Van Allsburg
 American picture books
 Science fiction picture books
 Jumanji
 American novels adapted into films
Sequel novels